Pollenia fumosa is a species of cluster fly in the family Polleniidae.

Distribution
New Zealand.

References

Polleniidae
Insects described in 1901
Diptera of Australasia
Taxa named by Frederick Hutton